A lame is a double-sided blade that is used to slash the tops of bread loaves in baking. A lame is used to score (also called slashing or docking) bread just before the bread is placed in the oven. Often the blade's cutting edge will be slightly concave-shaped, which allows users to cut flaps (called shag) considerably thinner than would be possible with a traditional straight razor.

A slash on the loaf's surface allows the dough to properly expand in the oven without tearing the skin or crust and also allows moisture to escape from the loaf. It also releases some of the gas, mainly carbon dioxide, that is trapped inside the dough. Proper scoring also allows the baker to control exactly where the loaf will open or bloom. This significantly improves the appearance of baked breads. Scoring, finally, creates varieties in forms and appearance. It brings out the bread baker's artistic talent, allowing a unique signature.

References
Jeffrey Hamelman (2004). Bread: A Baker's Book of Techniques and Recipes, John Wiley & Sons, Inc.  
REINHART, P. (1998). Crust & Crumb: Master Formulas for Serious Bread Bakers, Ten Speed Press

Kitchen knives